The 47th Baeksang Arts Awards ceremony was held at Kyung Hee University's Peace Palace Hall in Seoul on May 26, 2011, and was broadcast on KBS2. Presented by IS Plus Corp., it was hosted by actor Ryu Si-won and actress Kim Ah-joong.

Nominations and winners
Complete list of nominees and winners:

(Winners denoted in bold)

Film

Television

Other awards
 InStyle Fashionista Award - Lee Min-jung
 Lifetime Achievement Award - Shin Seong-il

References

External links
 

Baeksang
Baeksang
Baeksang Arts Awards
Baek
Baek
2010s in Seoul
2011 in South Korea